Global Harbor is a large shopping mall in Shanghai, China. It opened on 5 July 2013.

The mall is located at 3300 North Zhongshan Road, near Jinshajiang Road, in the Putuo District of Shanghai. It is attached to Jinshajiang Road Station (on Shanghai Metro Line 3, Line 4, and Line 13) via an underground entrance. It has a floor area of 480,000 square meters. The shops are located on six levels (two of them basement levels), with an underground parking level below. Twin skyscrapers rise above the mall, which can be seen through the glass roof. In the evening they are lit with computer-controlled animated multi-coloured lighting on the surface of the outer walls.

East China Normal University is located close to the Global Harbor mall to the southwest. Beyond that southwest is Changfeng Park.

Gallery

See also
 List of shopping malls in China
 Cloud Nine, a shopping mall at Zhongshan Park to the south

References

External links

 Global Harbor website 

2013 establishments in China
Shopping malls established in 2013
Shopping malls in Shanghai
Skyscrapers in Shanghai